Van Dyke brown, also known as Cassel earth or Cologne earth, is a dark brown colour named after the painter Anthony van Dyck.

The colour was originally made from peat or soil, and has been applied as both watercolour and oil paints. Today, the pigment is made by combining asphaltum-like black with iron oxide. This replicates the colour of the original iron oxide-rich earth found in Cassel and Cologne, Germany.

In popular culture
Television host Bob Ross frequently used Van Dyke brown oil paint on The Joy of Painting as a color for trees, cabins, and basecoats.

See also 
Lists of colors

References 

Shades of brown